Nick Waplington (born 1965) is a British / American artist and photographer. Many books of Waplington's work have been published, both self-published and through Aperture, Cornerhouse, Mack, Phaidon, and Trolley. His work has been shown in solo exhibitions at Tate Britain and The Photographers' Gallery in London, at Philadelphia Museum of Art in the USA, and at the National Museum of Photography, Film & Television in Bradford, UK; and in group exhibitions at Venice Biennale, Italy and Brooklyn Museum, New York City. In 1993 he was awarded an Infinity Award for Young Photographer by the International Center of Photography. His work is held in the permanent collections of the Solomon R. Guggenheim Museum in New York City, Victoria and Albert Museum and Government Art Collection in London, National Gallery of Australia, the Philadelphia Museum of Art, and Royal Library, Denmark.

Life and work
Waplington was born in Aden, Yemen. He traveled extensively during his childhood as his father worked as a scientist in the nuclear industry. He studied art at West Sussex College of Art & Design in Worthing, Trent Polytechnic in Nottingham and the Royal College of Art in London.

From 1984, Waplington would regularly visit his grandfather on the Broxtowe Estate in Aspley, Nottingham, where he began to photograph his immediate surroundings. Friends and neighbours of his family became his subject matter of choice. He continued with this work on and off for the next 15 years and from it came two books (Living Room and Weddings, Parties, Anything) and numerous exhibitions.

His book Other Edens (1994) focused on environmental concerns and, although it was conceived and worked on at the same time as Living Room, was seen as a major departure in style and content. This work is global in nature and its ideas are ambiguous and multi-layered.

Waplington's work was included in the touring exhibition, The Dead, curated by Val Williams and Greg Hobson, which opened at the National Museum of Photography, Film & Television in 1995.

Other bodies of his work include Safety in Numbers (1997), a bleak study of the ecstasy drug culture in the mid-1990s; The Indecisive Memento, a global road trip where the journey itself was the artwork (1999); Truth or Consequences (2001), a pictorial game based on the history of photography using the town of Truth or Consequences, New Mexico as a backdrop, inspired by the rules of the 1950s television show; and You Love Life (2005), in which he uses pictures taken over a 20-year period to construct an autobiographical narrative.

Learn How to Die the Easy Way (2002), Waplington's contribution to a group exhibition in part of the Venice Biennale 2001, expressed a yearning for the artistic and commercial freedom that the web might yet expose and a celebration of the dislocated reason behind conventional thoughts and media.

Waplington's graphic novel Terry Painter was made in collaboration with Miguel Calderon in 2003. This and other projects with Calderon including The Garden of Suburban Delights have been exhibited in Europe and the US.

In December 2007, the project space at the Whitechapel Gallery in London showed his slide show of found internet photos, entitled You Are Only What You See. The work was available at the time bound together in 10 publications of 100 images each, and there was a separate catalog of original photos by Waplington called Double Dactyl (2008).

Waplington worked on a major book project with the fashion designer Alexander McQueen during 2008/2009, called Working Process (2013), the title refers to both McQueen's working process as a fashion designer and Waplington's working process as an artist making photo books. In March 2015 this project became the first one-person exhibition by a British photographer in the main exhibition space at Tate Britain in London.

In 2011 Waplington self-published Lackadaisical, using a print on demand service, his response to increasingly expensive photobooks. It was later edited and expanded in the form of another edition called Extrapolations.

While continuing to make photographic works Waplington has since 2010 devoted most of his time to his practice as a painter.

Waplington participated in the photography collective This Place, founded by Frédéric Brenner, contributing the book Settlement (2014), a study of Jewish settlers living in the West Bank, portrait and landscape photographs taken with a large format camera.

Publications

Books by Waplington
Living Room.
Manchester: Cornerhouse, 1991.
New York: Aperture, 1991. .
Other Edens. New York: Aperture, 1994. . Marianne Wiggins contributes an introduction.
Weddings, Parties, Anything. Irvine Welsh contributes an essay.
Weddings, Parties, Anything. New York: Aperture, 1996. UK edition.
The Wedding. New York: Aperture, 1996. . US edition.
Safety in Numbers.
London: Booth Clibborn, 1997.
London: Booth Clibborn, 2002. .
The Indecisive Memento. London: Booth Clibborn, 1999. .
Truth or Consequences. London: Phaidon, 2001. .
Learn how to die the easy way. London: Trolley, 2002. . Waplington's contribution to a group exhibition at Venice Biennale in 2001.
Terry Painter. Self-published, 2003. Graphic novel, art directed, story and concept by Waplington and Miguel Calderon and illustration by Domingo & Celilia.
You Love Life. London: Trolley, 2005. .
Double Dactyl. London: Trolley, 2008. .
Working Process. New York: Damiani, 2013. .
Surf Riot. New York: Little Big Man, 2011. Edition of 300 copies.
Lackadaisical. New York: self-published, 2011. Edition of 100 copies.
Second expanded edition. New York: self-published, 2011. Edition of 100 copies.
Extrapolations. New York: self-published, 2011. Edition of 100 copies.
The Patriarch's Wardrobe. Melbourne: PAMBook, 2012. .
Settlement. London: Mack, 2014. .
Made Glorious Summer. Tokyo: Powershovel, 2014. . 3 volumes and 1 insert. Edition of 500 copies.
Living Room Work Prints. New York: Little Big Man, 2015. Edition of 700 copies.
Cunt Away. London: Morel Books. . Irvine Welsh contributes an essay. Edition of 200 Copies
We Live As We Dream, Alone. London: Morel, 2016. Edition of 500 copies.
Neither A Salt Spring Nor A Horse. New York: Pacific, 2018. Edition of 400 copies
Hackney Riviera. Jesus Blue, 2019.
The Search for a Superior Moral Justification for Selfishness. London: Morel, 2019.
Anaglypta 1980–2020. Self-published / Jesus Blue, 2020. . Edition of 1000 copies.

Zines by Waplington
A Good Man's Grave Is His Sabbath. Deadbeat Club 32. Deadbeat Club/Little Big Man, 2015. Edition of 400 copies.
Sesquipedalian. Geneva: Innen, 2017. Edition of 500 copies.
Thomas Floored. Self Published: JesusBlue Books, 2020 Edition of 25 copies. 
SOMMAT. London & New York: JesusBlue Books / 1972, 2021. Edition of 650 copies.

Book paired with another
Working Process. Bologna, Italy: Damiani, 2013. Edited by Alexander McQueen. . With a foreword by Susannah Frankel.

Exhibitions

Solo exhibitions
Living Room, The Photographers' Gallery, London, 1990–1991.
Living Room, and Circles of Civilization, Philadelphia Museum of Art, Philadelphia, PA, 1992.
Other Edens, The Photographers' Gallery, London, 1994–1995.
Weddings, Parties, Anything, National Museum of Photography, Film & Television, Bradford, UK, 1996.
You Are Only What You See and Double Dactyl, Whitechapel Gallery, London, 2007.
Working Process, Tate Britain, London, 2015.

Group exhibitions
The Dead, National Museum of Photography, Film & Television, 1995. Curated by Val Williams and Greg Hobson. Work by various photographers including Waplington, Nobuyoshi Araki, Krass Clement, Donigan Cumming, Hans Danuser, Andres Serrano.
Learn How to Die the Easy Way, Venice Biennale, 2001.
This Place, Brooklyn Museum, Brooklyn, New York City, 2016. Photographs by Waplington, Frédéric Brenner, Wendy Ewald, Martin Kollar, Josef Koudelka, Jungjin Lee, Gilles Peress, Fazal Sheikh, Stephen Shore, Rosalind Fox Solomon, Thomas Struth, and Jeff Wall.
A Handful of Dust, Le Bal, Paris, October 2015 – January 2016; Whitechapel Gallery, London, June–September 2017. Curated by David Campany.

Awards
1993: Infinity Award: Young Photographer, International Center of Photography, New York City

Collections
Waplington's work is held in the following permanent collections:
Gallery of Modern Art, Glasgow, UK
Government Art Collection, London: 1 print
Museum of Modern Art (MoMA), New York City
Solomon R. Guggenheim Museum, New York City
National Gallery of Australia, Canberra, Australia: 5 prints
Philadelphia Museum of Art, Philadelphia, PA: 4 prints
Royal Library, Denmark
Science Museum Group, UK: 2 prints and a book (as of 24 October 2022)
Victoria and Albert Museum, London: 14 pieces

References

External links
 
 Waplington's "Diary" site

1965 births
Living people
Photographers from Sussex